Josh Burdon (born 5 September 1992) is an Australian professional racing driver and 2016 Asian Formula Renault Series champion.He is currently driving for Hong Kong-based KC Motorgroup in the Intercontinental GT Challenge, Nürburgring Langstrecken Serie and GT World Challenge Europe.

Career
As a third generation racer, racing was in his blood. Burdon began his racing career kart racing at 8 years old winning various titles. At 16 he was touted as a future talent and was awarded with a funded scholarship through the Confederation of Australian Motorsport to make the transition into racing cars. He further progressed to competing internationally in 2012, and has gone on to compete in numerous racing series throughout the world.

In 2013 Burdon relocated to France and signed with Scorpus Racing driving the Xbox sponsored car in the open Whelen Euro Series. He led the championship from beginning to end, winning 7 out of 12 races  when he was controversially taken out during the final race in Le Mans. As a result he finished second in the championship. During the season he joined the final two rounds of French Formula Premium, winning both rounds in Circuit du Val de Vienne and Le Mans. Funding ruled Burdon out of a full time seat for most of the 2014-15 seasons.

2016 saw Burdon relocated to China to spearhead BlackArts Racing Team season in the Asian Formula Renault Series. He won the championship with 7 out of 12 race wins.
Burdon competed in the 2017-18 Asian Le Mans Series in LMP3 with KC Motorgroup, joining him was Neric Wei and Louis Prette. Burdon swept qualifying after winning 4 pole positions from 4 attempts at Zhuhai International Circuit, Fuji Speedway, Chang International Circuit and Sepang International Circuit. Burdon, Wei and Prette won in Zhuhai, Thailand and were leading the final race in Sepang when an exhaust broke and took them out of contention for the win. They ended second in the championship.

In 2018 Burdon was signed by Taiwanese celebrity Jimmy Lin to compete for his team PTRS in the China LMP3 Series. Burdon won the championship after dominating the final round in Tianjin, despite a publicly difficult relationship with the team as the season progressed. He also competed in the first rounds of GT World Challenge Asia with Absolute Racing, partnering with Anthony Liu driving an Audi R8 LMS GT3 as a Pro Am lineup, Burdon picked up pole position on his GT3 debut in Sepang International Circuit, Malaysia.

Pre season in 2019 KC Motorgroup announced Burdon joining its expanding international GT3 program, where they fielded the official GT3 entries for Nissan with the Nissan GT-R GT3. He was placed into the #35 where he joined factory Japanese Nissan drivers Tsugio Matsuda and Katsumasa Chiyo. They competed in the Intercontinental GT Challenge and the Nürburgring Langstrecken Serie. The season kicked off with the 2019 Bathurst 12 Hour, where Burdon picked up fastest lap of the race after mechanical issue took them out of the fight for the win while battling inside the top 5 at mid race distance. Burdon escaped serious injury in scary crash during the 2019 24 Hours of Nürburgring after slowing for a code 60 zone on the Dottinger Hohe a lower category car was not paying attention and hit Burdon from behind with a significant impact.

Personal life
Burdon was born in Hobart, the capital city of Tasmania. He was educated at St Virgils College, a Roman Catholic boys school that puts much importance on sport. Graduated high school and did not complete further studies after turning full focus towards being a racing driver.

Racing Record

Complete WeatherTech SportsCar Championship results 
(key) (Races in bold indicate pole position; races in italics indicate fastest lap)

K&N Pro Series West

External links
Profile at Driver Database

References

 
 
 http://www.dailysportscar.com/2018/11/12/moore-and-burdon-take-chinese-endurance-championship-win.html
 
 
 
 

1992 births
Living people
Sportspeople from Hobart
Australian racing drivers
Asian Formula Renault Challenge drivers
24H Series drivers
NASCAR drivers
WeatherTech SportsCar Championship drivers
Andretti Autosport drivers
KCMG drivers
Nürburgring 24 Hours drivers
Nismo drivers
Graff Racing drivers
Chinese F4 Championship drivers
BlackArts Racing drivers
Le Mans Cup drivers
TCR Europe Touring Car Series drivers